Appointment with Danger is a 1950 American crime film noir directed by Lewis Allen and written by Richard L. Breen and Warren Duff. The drama features Alan Ladd, Phyllis Calvert and Paul Stewart, among others.

Plot
At the Hotel Compton in Gary, Indiana, U.S. postal inspector Harry Gruber is murdered by two men, Joe Regas and George Soderquist. They dump the body in La Porte during a rainstorm, but just then a nun, Sister Augustine, passes near them. Soderquist tries to distract her by helping unfurl her umbrella and pretending Gruber is drunk, but she reports the incident.

Postal inspector Al Goddard is assigned to the case. He traces Sister Augustine to a convent in Fort Wayne, and recites to her a quotation from Martin Luther about personal responsibility. She then agrees to go to the police station, where she identifies Soderquist from a mug book, and then to Gary in the hope of identifying him there in person. She will stay at a convent there until she is needed to testify in court.

Soderquist is seen by Goddard and Sister Augustine with another gang member, Paul Ferrar, but gets away. Meanwhile, Regas, whom Mary does not recognize, sees her and telephones Earl Boettiger, the head of the gang and owner of the Hotel Compton, warning him to hide Soderquist. Later, when Soderquist rejects an order to leave town, they kill him.

Goddard realizes that as Soderquist has not left town, the gang must still be planning something. He talks to the Gary postmaster, who suggests a likely target for theft: a money shipment that arrives regularly in Gary by train but must change to another train, involving a seven-minute truck ride between stations. Gruber had asked him about the truck's drivers, one of whom recently declined a chance at a higher-paying job; it is Ferrar, and Goddard recognizes him from before.

Goddard, posing as a corrupt inspector, pressures Ferrar to meet the head of the gang. He then asks Boettiger to join the gang, promising to be a more reliable inside man than is Ferrar. The plan is indeed to steal the money shipment, expected to be worth $1 million. Meanwhile, Regas is still worried about Sister Augustine and tries unsuccessfully to stage a fatal accident for her.

When Boettiger makes a last-minute change to the plan, Goddard has no choice but to phone the police from the gang's hotel suite. He is heard by Boettiger's mistress, hotel employee Dodie, but she protects him because she does not want to be an accessory to his murder. She "reports" the planned crime to him in order to stay on the right side of the law, and says she is leaving town at once.

The robbery does not go as smoothly as hoped, because Regas neglects his part in the preparations to take Sister Augustine prisoner. When the gang meets, she blurts Goddard's name, revealing his deception. He pleads for them not to kill her, then buys time by starting a fight. As police arrive, a shootout ensues in an industrial district, ending in the death of all the gang members.

Cast
 Alan Ladd as Al Goddard
 Phyllis Calvert as Sister Augustine
 Paul Stewart as Earl Boettiger
 Jan Sterling as Dodie
 Jack Webb as Joe Regas
 Stacy Harris as Paul Ferrar
 Harry Morgan as George Soderquist (credited as Henry Morgan)
 David Bauer as David Goodman (as David Wolfe)
 Dan Riss as Maury Ahearn
 Geraldine Wall as Mother Ambrose
 George J. Lewis as Leo Cronin
 Paul Lees as Gene Gunner

Background
The film was announced in July 1948 as Postal Inspector. It was always envisioned as a vehicle for Alan Ladd. Ardel Wray and Robert L. Richards wrote the script, and the film was meant to follow Chicago Deadline. However, production was pushed back to allow Ladd to make Captain Carey, U.S.A. The film's title was changed to Dead Letter. William Keighley was originally announced as director, then he was replaced by Lewis Allen.

Phyllis Calvert was signed in April 1949. According to Calvert, the studio did not believe that she would accept the part, as she had turned down several previous film offers.

After six weeks of script rewrites, filming began on June 16, 1949. The title was changed again to United States Mail.

The film features both Jack Webb and Harry Morgan as villains; both would later work on the Dragnet television show as Los Angeles police detectives. The film's co-writer Richard L. Breen had previously worked with Webb on the radio series Pat Novak for Hire, and would write at least three scripts for Dragnet, including the 1954 theatrical film and the 1966 TV-movie pilot for the revival series.

Reception
The film was not released in the U.S. until 1951, when it was retitled Appointment with Danger. It had been released in the U.K. almost a year earlier.

The movie was nominated for the Edgar Award for best mystery film of the year by the Mystery Writers of America, but lost to Five Fingers.

Critical response
Bosley Crowther, film critic for The New York Times, liked the film, especially the screenplay. He wrote, "[I]t's fairly obvious that it's all familiar stuff to our hero, for he evinces as much emotion over these muscular goings-on as a postal clerk counting air mail stamps. But he is fortunate in having a vehicle, which is basically a cops-and-robbers tale, tautly written by scenarists Richard Breen and Warren Duff, who also have injected humor in the modern idiom into their dialogue. And he is fortunate too in having the support of principals who handle these lines and roles as to the manner born.  As a result, Appointment With Danger lives up to its title as Ladd, checking on the murder of another postal inspector in Gary, Ind., finds a visiting nun who saw the criminals."

Variety gave the film a positive review, writing, "Ladd is right at home as the tightlipped, tough inspector assigned to the case. There is a neat contrasting byplay in the nun character done by Phyllis Calvert as co-star, which adds an offbeat note to the meller plot."

References

External links
 
 
 
 Appointment with Danger informational site at DVD Talk
Appointment with Danger at Noir of the Week
 Appointment with Danger film clip at Veoh
  (Jack Webb & Harry Morgan)

1950 films
1950 crime drama films
American black-and-white films
American heist films
1950s English-language films
Film noir
Films scored by Victor Young
Films directed by Lewis Allen
Paramount Pictures films
American crime drama films
Films shot in Indiana
Films shot in Chicago
Films about the United States Postal Service
1950s American films